In the Dungannon land mine attack of 16 December 1979, the Provisional Irish Republican Army (IRA) ambushed two British Army landrovers with an improvised land mine and gunfire outside Dungannon, County Tyrone, Northern Ireland.  Four British soldiers were killed in the attack.

Background
Since the beginning of its campaign in 1970, the Provisional IRA had carried out many improvised landmine and roadside bomb attacks on British forces in the region. In September 1972, three British soldiers were killed when their armoured vehicle was blown up by an IRA land mine at Sanaghanroe, near Dungannon. In March 1974, two IRA members were killed on the Aughnacloy Road near Dungannon when the landmine they were planting exploded prematurely.

On 27 August 1979, the IRA killed 18 British soldiers with roadside bombs in the Warrenpoint ambush in south County Down; the deadliest attack on British troops during the conflict.

Attack
On 16 December 1979, two armoured British Army landrovers were driving along Ballygawley Road, about two miles outside Dungannon. A unit of the IRA's East Tyrone Brigade had planted a  improvised landmine in a culvert under the road at Glenadush. When the second vehicle reached the culvert, the landmine was detonated by remote control. It blew the vehicle into the air and killed four soldiers outright: William Beck (23), Keith Richards (22), Simon Evans (19) and Allan Ayrton (23). The IRA also opened fire on the first landrover after the blast, but there were no further casualties.

See also
 Chronology of Provisional Irish Republican Army actions (1970–79)
 Ballygawley bus bombing
 Ballygawley land mine attack
 Altnaveigh landmine attack
 1990 Downpatrick roadside bomb

References

Explosions in 1979
Provisional Irish Republican Army actions
Military history of County Tyrone
1979 in Northern Ireland
Improvised explosive device bombings in Northern Ireland
The Troubles in County Tyrone
British Army in Operation Banner
Military actions and engagements during the Troubles (Northern Ireland)
December 1979 events in the United Kingdom